Peter of Enghien (or Pierre d'Enghien) (died 1384) was Count of Lecce from 1380 to 1384.

He inherited the County of Lecce on the death of his father, John of Enghien, in 1380. He married Margaret, daughter of Guy of Luxembourg, Count of Ligny. However, the marriage was childless, and he was succeeded in Lecce by his sister, Mary of Enghien.

References 

1384 deaths
Counts of Lecce
Year of birth unknown